The V National Assembly of Venezuela is the current sitting of the National Assembly. It is the meeting of the legislative branch of Venezuelan federal government, comprising the National Assembly of Venezuela. It met in Caracas following the 2020 Venezuelan parliamentary election.

Members 
The PSUV-led Great Patriotic Pole alliance won a supermajority of seats.

In January 2021, a new assembly was formed.

In February 2021, the assembly voted to expel the Ambassador from the European Union.

See also 
 I National Assembly of Venezuela
 II National Assembly of Venezuela
 III National Assembly of Venezuela
 IV National Assembly of Venezuela

References 

National Assembly (Venezuela)